Jože Šmit (1 February 1922 – 7 February 2004) was a Slovene poet, translator, editor and journalist.

Šmit was born in the village of Tlake near Rogatec in eastern Slovenia in 1922. The house in which he was born and spent his childhood is preserved on a new location at the Rogatec Open-Air Museum where it was moved to in 1981 as a typical example of an early 19th-century Sub-Pannonian house. He studied forestry at Vienna between 1942 and 1943 and was drafted into the German Army. During the Invasion of Normandy he was captured and sent to England as a prisoner of war and then to Italy, where he joined the Overseas Brigade of the Yugoslav Liberation Army and returned to Yugoslavia.  After the war he worked as a journalist and studied Comparative literature and Slavic languages and literature at the University of Ljubljana, but was sent to work in Litija and abandoned his studies. He worked as an editor and proof-reader and is also known for his translations, particularly for his translation from the Latin of the poet Catullus. He also wrote prose and poetry for young children. He died in Ljubljana in 2004.

In 1970 he won the Levstik Award for his poetry collection Kako bomo umirali (How We Shall Die).

Published works

 Poetry collections
 Srce v bedi (The Heart in Poverty), 1950
 Dvojni cvet (The Double Flower), 1953
 Trepetlika (The Trembling Poplar), 1962
 Lirika časa (Lyrics of Time), 1965
 Lirična postila (A Lyrical Fasting Book), 1965
 Kolosej iz cedelike (The Strainer Colosseum), 1967
 Kako bomo umirali (How We Shall Die), 1970
 Zlo stoletja (The Evil of the Century), 1971
 Hoja za Katulom (Walking after Catullus), 1972
 Grenki med (Bitter Honey), 1990

 Prose for Young Readers
 Marjetka (Little Margaret), 1951
 Kaj nam je popisal Jakec (What Little Jack Told Us), 1953
 Pol za šalo pol za res (Half For Fun and Half Seriously), 1956
 Kdo živi v tej kišici (Who Lives in This Little House), 1959
 Ježek se ženi (The Hedgehog's Wedding), 1974

References

Slovenian poets
Slovenian male poets
Slovenian translators
Slovenian journalists
Slovenian children's writers
1922 births
2004 deaths
Levstik Award laureates
University of Ljubljana alumni
Yugoslav Partisans members
German Army personnel of World War II
University of Vienna alumni
20th-century translators
20th-century poets
People from the Municipality of Rogatec
20th-century journalists
Yugoslav poets